The Raleigh mayoral election of 2007 was held on 9 October 2007 to elect a Mayor of Raleigh, North Carolina.  It was won by Democratic incumbent Charles Meeker, who was unopposed.

Results

Footnotes

2007
Raleigh
2007 North Carolina elections